Antelope is a census-designated place in Sacramento County, California, United States located approximately  northeast of downtown Sacramento and  southwest of Roseville. The population was 45,770 at the 2010 census.

Geography

Antelope is mostly flat, with very few hills and no major bodies of water.

The northern border of Antelope falls directly onto the line between Sacramento County and Placer County.

The eastern border first follows Roseville Road south from the county line to Butternut Drive. Then the border continues in the same general direction to Antelope Road, so that parcels on Adagio Way, Andante Drive and Katella Way are within Antelope CDP.

The southern border follows Antelope Road.

The western border has two parts. The first part extends from Antelope Rd northwards toward Elverta Rd along 28th St. The second part extends from Elverta Rd towards the Placer county line, along Dry Creek.

The boundaries were drawn and the town name established by a vote in 1993 to establish the community's identity.  The Antelope, CA town designation began July 1, 1994. The ZIP code for Antelope: 95843

History

In the late 1800s, Antelope was the only significant settlement in the Center Township, an area bounded on the North by the Placer county line, on the East by what is now Sunrise Blvd., on the South by the American River, and on the West by the line along 20th St in Rio Linda south to Ethan Way in the Arden-Arcade area. The population of the entire township in 1880 was about 400 people.  Many of the railroad workers made their homes here and eventually stayed permanently. Gradually, workers left the area and Antelope became just another small community with little business.

On April 28, 1973, Antelope consisted of a post office, general store and a half-dozen homes. However, at 8:03 a.m., a rail car loaded with aircraft bombs exploded in the southern part of the Southern Pacific's Roseville Yard, destroying the general store and damaging most of the homes.  This event changed Antelope forever - it basically was blown away.

What is known as Antelope today mostly began as a planned community in the late 1980s. It consisted of mainly single-family homes and apartments. Due to the relative newness of the community, most homes are new and the area is well planned out. The proposed and ultimate closure of nearby McClellan Air Force Base between the years 1993-2001 did have a slowing-down economic impact upon this area (the “North Watt Avenue corridor”).  Antelope received its own postmark and recognition as a community by the U.S. Postal Service on 1 July 1994.

Demographics

2010
The 2010 United States Census reported that Antelope had a population of 45,770. The racial makeup of Antelope was 29,200 (63.8%) White, 4,039 (8.8%) African American, 402 (0.9%) Native American, 6,090 (13.3%) Asian, 407 (0.9%) Pacific Islander, 2,284 (5.0%) from other races, and 3,348 (7.3%) from two or more races. Hispanic or Latino of any race were 6,635 persons (14.5%).

The Census reported that 45,686 people (99.8% of the population) lived in households, 57 (0.1%) lived in non-institutionalized group quarters, and 27 (0.1%) were institutionalized.

There were 14,159 households, out of which 7,138 (50.4%) had children under the age of 18 living in them, 8,259 (58.3%) were opposite-sex married couples living together, 2,184 (15.4%) had a female householder with no husband present, 860 (6.1%) had a male householder with no wife present.  There were 888 (6.3%) unmarried opposite-sex partnerships, and 106 (0.7%) same-sex married couples or partnerships. 2,107 households (14.9%) were made up of individuals, and 447 (3.2%) had someone living alone who was 65 years of age or older. The average household size was 3.23.  There were 11,303 families (79.8% of all households); the average family size was 3.59.

The population was spread out, with 14,253 people (31.1%) under the age of 18, 4,495 people (9.8%) aged 18 to 24, 13,238 people (28.9%) aged 25 to 44, 10,931 people (23.9%) aged 45 to 64, and 2,853 people (6.2%) who were 65 years of age or older.  The median age was 31.4 years. For every 100 females, there were 94.3 males.  For every 100 females age 18 and over, there were 91.2 males.

The homeowner vacancy rate was 2.7%; the rental vacancy rate was 3.9%.  30,801 people (67.3% of the population) lived in owner-occupied housing units and 14,885 people (32.5%) lived in rental housing units.

2000
As of the 2000 census, the United States did not define a census-designated place called Antelope, but it did define a Zip Code Tabulation Area (ZCTA), 95843. Because Antelope is contained within this ZCTA, it is possible to obtain Census data from the United States 2000 Census for the area even though data for "Antelope" is unavailable.

As of the census of 2000, there were 36,421 people, 11,655 households, and 9,341 families residing in the ZCTA of 95843. The racial makeup of the ZCTA was 65.5% White, 10.1% African American, 0.9% Native American, 11.9% Asian, 0.6% Pacific Islander, 4% from other races, and 7% from two or more races. 10.7% of the population were Hispanic or Latino of any race.

There were 11,655 households, out of which 55.4% had children under the age of 18 living with them, 62.4% were married couples living together, 13.2% had a female householder with no husband present, and 19.9% were non-families. 1.8% had someone living alone who was 65 years of age or older. The average household size was 3.12 and the average family size was 3.47.

In the ZCTA the population was spread out, with 37.1% under age 20, 5.6% from 20 to 24, 48.6% from 25 to 54, 4.9% from 55 to 64, and 4% who were 65 years of age or older. The median age was 30.3 years. For every 100 females, there were 95.7 males. For every 100 females age 18 and over, there were 90.7 males.

The median income for a household is $59,151, and the median income for a family was $60,840. Males had a median income of $40,573 versus $32,302 for females. The per capita income for the community was $21,373. 5.4% of the population and 4.1% of families were below the poverty line. Out of the total people living in poverty, 2.5% are under the age of 18 and 4.6% are 65 or older.

Government

Since Antelope is an unincorporated part of Sacramento County, all non-traffic related law enforcement incidents are handled by the Sacramento County Sheriff's Department, stationed out of the North Division.  All traffic related incidents occurring in unincorporated Antelope are handled by the California Highway Patrol North Sacramento Area Office.  All of the Center Unified School District property is mainly patrolled by the Twin Rivers Unified School District Police Department via contract, while both the Sunrise Parks and Recreation District and the Rio Linda Elverta Recreation and Parks District have a contract with the Fulton-El Camino Park Police Department.

Parks
Parks in Antelope are under the jurisdiction of the Sunrise Parks and Recreation District as well as the Rio Linda Elverta Recreation and Parks District, which are both policed under contract by the Fulton–El Camino Park Police Department.

Tetotom Park
Tetotom Park is located on the corner of Don Julio Blvd and North Loop Dr in Antelope near Antelope Crossing Middle School. It consists of a plastic playground, two tennis courts, a volleyball court, a multipurpose field, and a baseball diamond. It also contains four barbecues.

Pokelma Park
Pokelma Park is located on Quiet Knolls Drive off of Elverta Road (behind WinCo Foods). It consists of a plastic playground, two tennis courts, a basketball court, and a baseball diamond.

Lone Oak Park
Lone Oak Park is at Elverta and Gray Mare Way, located directly next to Center High School, with a gate for students to enter from the park. It consists of a plastic playground updated with First 5 Grant money in 2009, swings with handicap access, a baseball field, a soccer field, with many benches and trees to sit under.

Blue Oak Park
Blue Oak Park is located at Big Cloud and Heathston Ct, behind Bel-Air Market (Big Cloud leads to a dead end at Old Walerga, which is blocked by a fence from both the park and Big Cloud). It consists of multiple plastic playground and a big, grassy field. There are no restrooms.

Northbrook Park (formerly Antelope Greens Park)
This park is located at Meadow Hawk and Tourmaline Way, which is in a neighborhood between Center High School and McClellan High School off Watt Ave. It is almost hidden to the public, behind some houses and the offskirts of a golf course (which is blocked by a huge fence). You cannot actually see the park from the streets, just the paved bike path and a big gate, which is closed and locked at night. The park contains one half-court basketball court. It is located directly next to Dry Creek, and on the other side of the creek lies Gibson Ranch. This park is not operated by Sunrise Parks and Recreation District. Locals call it Hidden Park.

Antelope Community Park
Antelope Community Park is mainly known as The Park of Dreams, which is the name listed on a painted wall in front of the park. It is located at 8012 Palmerson Drive, between a huge dirt field and the local fire station. The park formerly consisted of a wooden playground that has since been replaced with a plastic and metal playground offering several unique playsets. The park has a trail through the dirt field and many benches in the  park.

Antelope Station Park
Antelope Station Park is a park for the youngest children. Contains one small play set, a garden and some benches. It is located at 6306 Outlook Drive.

Almond Grove
Almond Grove is located at 7691 Eagle Point Way. It consists of a  field with no playsets.

Firestone Park
Firestone park is a  park located at 5415 Poker Lane near Olive Grove Elementary School. It consists of a baseball diamond, two basketball courts, a multipurpose field, a soccer field, benches, bike racks, BBQ and covered picnic tables. The park has children's playsets. This is also where the 2015 Antelope Little league Baseball champions The Braves practice.

Roseview Park
Roseview Park is a  park located at 5848 Ridgepoint Drive. It consists of a play area, a BBQ, a garden area, a baseball diamond and a basketball court.

Schools
The following a list of the schools serving Antelope:

Center Unified School District

Elementary schools (K-5)
 Oak Hill Elementary School
 Dudley Elementary School
 North Country Elementary School
 Spinelli Elementary School

Junior high schools

 Wilson C. Riles Middle School

High schools
 Center High School
Antelope High School
 McClellan Continuation High School

Charter schools
 Antelope View Charter School (located at the lower part of the old Center Junior High School)
 Global Youth Charter School (Formerly located at the lower part of the old Center Junior High School. Permanently Closed since 2017.

Dry Creek Joint Elementary School District

Elementary schools (K-5)
 Antelope Meadows Elementary
 Barrett Ranch Elementary
 Olive Grove Elementary
 Heritage Oak Elementary
 Coyote Ridge Elementary
 Quail Glen Elementary
 Dry Creek Elementary (To be closed in 2014)

Junior high schools (6-8)
 Antelope Crossing Middle School
 Creekview Ranch Middle School
 Silverado Middle School

Roseville Joint Union High School District
 Antelope High School

Utilities
Sacramento Municipal Utility District provides electric service to the area and PG&E provides natural gas service. Antelope is served by Consolidated Communications, Comcast, and AT&T for its telephone and Internet needs. Not all three providers are available in all areas of the city.

References

External links

 Archive of Antelope official webpage on Sacramento County website, dated June 13, 2010
 OfficIal Sacramento County Website
 Antelope Community Web
 Sunrise Recreation Park District - Antelope

Census-designated places in Sacramento County, California
Census-designated places in California